The Bedside Drama: A Petite Tragedy is the second album by the band of Montreal. It was released on Kindercore Records in 1998.

Critical reception
SF Weekly thought that "when the band's sound jells ... Of Montreal easily hold its own alongside such pop adventurers as Brian Wilson and Harry Nilsson."

AllMusic wrote: "A continuation and maturation of the playfulness exhibited on earlier releases, Of Montreal create a brand of theatrical psychedelic pop that many of their '60s predecessors hinted at but only a few achieved."

Track listing
 "One of a Very Few of a Kind" - 1:38
 "Happy Yellow Bumblebee" - 2:17
 "Little Viola Hidden in the Orchestra" - 3:37
 "The Couple's First Kiss" - 1:28
 "Sing You a Love You Song" - 2:36
 "Honeymoon in San Francisco" - 2:35
 "The Couple in Bed Together Under a Warm Blanket Wrapped Up in Each Other's Arms Asleep" - 1:24
 "Cutie Pie" - 2:19
 "Panda Bear" - 4:48
 "Sadness Creeping Up and Scaring Away the Couple's Happiness" - 1:29
 "Please Tell Me So" - 2:19
 "My Darling, I've Forgotten" - 2:11
 "You Feel You Must Go, Don't Go!" - 2:07
 "Just Recently Lost Something of Importance" - 2:25
 "The Hollow Room" - 1:47
 "It's Easy to Sleep When You're Dead" - 4:29

The Japanese release contained two bonus tracks which appear on the United States release of Horse & Elephant Eatery (No Elephants Allowed): The Singles and Songles Album.

 "In the Army Kid"
 "Montreal Makes Me Sad Again (also known as "Julie the Mouse")"

References

External links
 The Bedside Drama: A Petite Tragedy lyrics

Bedside Drama: A Petite Tragedy, The
Bedside Drama: A Petite Tragedy, The
Kindercore Records albums